Southern Premier League may refer to:

Association football
 Southern Football League, premier division, in England
 Southern Championship, formerly known as the Southern Premier League, in Tasmania, Australia
 FootballSouth Premier League, also known as the Southern Men's Premier League, in New Zealand

Other sports
 Southern Premier Cricket League, in England